Stelvio may refer to

 Stelvio, the Italian name for the municipality of Stilfs in South Tyrol
 Stelvio (ski course), a downhill ski course in Bormio, Italy
 Stelvio Pass, a mountain pass in Italy
 Stelvio National Park, a national park of Italy
 Stelvio Piste, a downhill skiing course named after the Stelvio Pass located in Bormio
 Stelvio (cheese), a cheese named after the village
 Stelvio, a suburb of Newport, United Kingdom
 Stélvio (footballer), Angolan footballer
 Stelvio Cipriani, Italian composer
 Stelvio Massi, Italian film director
 Stelvio Mestrovich, Italian musicologist
 Alfa Romeo Stelvio, a sport utility vehicle named for the Stelvio Pass
 Moto Guzzi Stelvio, a dual-sport motorcycle named for the Stelvio Pass and manufactured by the Italian company, Moto Guzzi, since 2007